Adrian Ionescu may refer to:

 Adrian Ionescu (footballer, born 1985), Romanian football defensive midfielder
 Adrian Ionescu (footballer, born 1958), Romanian football forward
 Adrian Mihai Ionescu, professor at the Swiss Federal Institute of Technology